The 1996 vice presidential debate, part of the 1996 presidential election, featured then vice-president Al Gore, a Democrat and Republican opposition, Jack Kemp.

Venue
Filming took place at the Mahaffey Theater at the Bayfront Center in St. Petersburg, Florida. Jim Lehrer of PBS moderated the debate.

External links
 Video at C-SPAN
 Transcript on PBS

1996 United States presidential election